Prakasam Stadium was a cricket ground in Guntur, Andhra Pradesh, India.  The ground held two first-class matches in the 1958/59 Ranji Trophy, with Andhra Pradesh playing Hyderabad and Mysore.

References

External links
Prakasam Stadium at ESPNcricinfo
Prakasam Stadium at CricketArchive

Sport in Guntur
Cricket grounds in Andhra Pradesh
Buildings and structures in Guntur
Defunct cricket grounds in India
Year of establishment missing